John G. Trice (May 12, 1902 – October 8, 1923) was an American college football player who became the first African-American athlete for Iowa State College. Trice died due to injuries suffered during a game against the University of Minnesota on October 6, 1923. He is the namesake for Jack Trice Stadium, Iowa State's football stadium.

Background
Trice was born in Hiram, Ohio, in 1902, the son of a former Buffalo Soldier, Green Trice. As a child, Trice was active in sports and demonstrated outstanding athletic skills. In 1918, Trice's mother sent him to Cleveland, Ohio, to live with an uncle. Trice attended East Technical High School, where he played football. In 1922, Trice followed five of his teammates, as well as his former high school coach, Sam Willaman, to Iowa State College in Ames, Iowa.

While attending Iowa State, Trice participated in track and football (primarily as a tackle). He majored in animal husbandry, with the desire to go to the South after graduation, and use his knowledge to help African-American farmers. In the summer before his freshman year at the age of 19, Trice married Cora Mae Starland, who was only 15. They both found jobs in order to support themselves through school. Trice also was a member of Alpha Phi Alpha fraternity, and initiated through the Alpha Nu chapter (Drake and Iowa State University).

On October 5, 1923, the night before his second college football game, Trice wrote the following in a letter on stationery at a racially segregated hotel in Minneapolis/St. Paul (the letter was later found in Trice's suit just before his funeral):

The game, Trice's death, and aftermath
On October 6, 1923, Trice and his Iowa State College teammates played against the University of Minnesota in Minneapolis. On the night of the game, Trice got to stay at the same hotel as his teammates who stayed at the Radisson Hotel, but he could not eat with them in the dining room.

During the second play of the game, Trice's collarbone was broken. Trice insisted he was all right and returned to the game. In the third quarter, while attempting to tackle a University of Minnesota ball carrier, Trice ended up on his back after a roll block (a play which is now banned) and was trampled by three Minnesota players. Although he claimed to be fine, Trice was not able to stand and was removed from the game and sent to a Minneapolis hospital. The doctors declared him fit to travel and he returned by train to Ames with his teammates. On October 8, 1923, Trice died from hemorrhaged lungs and internal bleeding as a result of the injuries sustained during the game.

There was a great deal of speculation surrounding the play that resulted in Trice's death. Iowa State teammate Johnny Behm told the Cleveland Plain Dealer in a 1979 interview that "one person told me that nothing out of the ordinary happened. But another who saw it said it was murder."

Iowa State dismissed all classes after 3 p.m. on October 9, 1923, in honor of Trice.

Trice's funeral was held at the Iowa State College's central campus in Ames on October 16, 1923, with 4,000 students and faculty members in attendance. His casket was draped in cardinal and gold (Iowa State's school colors) before he was buried. Trice's casket was transported to Hiram, Ohio for burial at Fairview Cemetery.

As a result of his death, Iowa State did not renew its contract to play against Minnesota for 66 years. The teams did not play again until 1989.

Legacy

In 1973, Jack Trice's legacy was renewed and a promotion began to name Iowa State's new stadium after him. In 1974, Iowa State University's student body government voted unanimously to endorse this effort. In addition, the Jack Trice Stadium Committee compiled more than 3,000 signatures from supporters. However, an Iowa State University ad hoc committee voted to advise then-Iowa State University President W. Robert Parks to name the stadium "Cyclone Stadium."

In 1984, the stadium was named Cyclone Stadium and the playing field was named "Jack Trice Field." The ISU student body government, wanting to do more to honor Trice, raised money to erect a statue of Trice in 1987. Due to the persistence of the student body government, students, alumni, faculty and staff, and other supporters (including public figures such as Paul Newman, Hubert Humphrey, and Nikki Giovanni), the football stadium at Iowa State University was finally named Jack Trice Stadium in 1997. Jack Trice Stadium is currently the only Division I FBS stadium or arena to be named after an African-American.

Though the statement is disputed, Jack Trice is believed by some to be the innovator behind the "shovel", "shuffle", shuttle" or "Utah" pass, a short forward pass generally to the running or up back behind the line of scrimmage. According to legend, Trice conceived the concept and presented to coach Sam Willaman. When Willaman attempted the play in a game against Drake later that year, the ball was dropped and the official incorrectly called it a fumble. The play was not used again and disappeared from college football until it was resurrected by Jack Cortice at the University of Utah in 1957.

In 2015, the story of Jack Trice was being shopped around to movie studios with the hopes that a film is made. A successful stage play debuted in 2010.

See also
 Johnny Bright incident

References

Further reading

External links

 Iowa State University's Jack Trice Stadium cyclones.com
 Iowa State University's Jack Trice Digital Collection digitalcollections.lib.iastate.edu
 Jack Trice at www.isualum.org
 Jack Trice at aaregistry.org

1902 births
1923 deaths
Iowa State Cyclones football players
People from Hiram, Ohio
Players of American football from Ohio
African-American players of American football
20th-century African-American sportspeople
Deaths from pulmonary hemorrhage
Sports deaths in Iowa